Area code 781 covers most of Boston‘s inner suburbs (the Route 128 corridor) and some outer suburbs (especially in the South Shore region). It was created as a split from area code 617 on September 1, 1997 (LATA code 128). Use of 781 became mandatory February 1, 1998. Area code 339 has been sharing the service area since May 2, 2001. Since then, 10 digit local dialing is mandatory.

Some mobile phone numbers from the 1990s assigned to rate centers in 781 and 339 kept the 617 area code just on those mobile lines after it was split.

Communities

Abington
Arlington
Bedford
Braintree
Burlington
Canton
Cohasset
Dedham
Duxbury
Halifax
Hanover
Hanson
Hingham
Holbrook
Hull
Kingston
Lexington
Lincoln
Lynn
Lynnfield
Malden
Marblehead
Marshfield
Medford
Melrose
Nahant
Needham
Norwell
Norwood
Pembroke
Plympton
Randolph
Reading
Revere
Rockland
Saugus
Scituate
Sharon
Stoneham
Stoughton
Swampscott
Wakefield
Waltham
Wellesley
Weston
Westwood
Weymouth
Whitman
Winchester
Woburn

Counties
Portions of the following counties are covered:
Essex
Middlesex
Norfolk
Plymouth
Suffolk

Regions
 Most of the South Shore and some of the North Shore
 Suburbs along Route 128 and some surrounding towns

Central office codes (by location)
(781)-NXX

 Arlington (includes part of Medford): 316, 443, 483, 488, 574, 583, 641, 643, 645, 646, 648, 777, 819, 844, 859
 Braintree: 228, 267, 303, 348, 353, 356, 380, 394, 428, 510, 519, 535, 602, 654, 664, 794, 796, 817, 843, 848, 849, 884, 917, 926, 930, 952, 964
 Burlington: 202, 203, 221, 229, 238, 262, 265, 270, 272, 273, 313, 328, 345, 359, 362, 365, 387, 418, 425, 442, 494, 505, 552, 564, 565, 601, 653, 685, 730, 743, 744, 750, 757, 791, 825, 852, 892, 896, 993, 998
 Canton: 232, 298, 302, 332, 363, 364, 401, 415, 562, 571, 575, 615, 633, 713, 737, 739, 746, 770, 774, 821, 828, 830, 989
 Cohasset: 210, 236, 383, 527, 923
 Dedham (includes part of Westwood): 223, 251, 320, 326, 329, 355, 366, 375, 381, 407, 410, 441, 459, 461, 467, 471, 492, 493, 613, 636, 686, 690, 708, 742, 751, 752, 801, 915
 Hingham: 374, 385, 556, 630, 706, 735, 740, 741, 749, 783, 804, 836, 875, 903, 908, 919
 Hull: 214, 242, 773, 925
 Lexington (includes Bedford): 226, 230, 240, 266, 271, 274, 275, 276, 280, 301, 323, 325, 354, 357, 372, 377, 382, 402, 430, 456, 457, 458, 482, 515, 532, 533, 538, 541, 553, 597, 652, 669, 671, 674, 676, 687, 698, 734, 748, 761, 766, 778, 841, 845, 860, 861, 862, 863, 869, 879, 918, 945, 958, 981, 999
 Lincoln: 259
 Lynn: 215, 244, 248, 254, 268, 309, 346, 477, 479, 581, 584, 586, 592, 593, 594, 595, 596, 598, 599, 632, 691, 710, 715, 718, 731, 771, 780, 842, 910, 913
 Malden: 288, 321, 322, 324, 333, 338, 388, 397, 399, 420, 480, 502, 605, 627, 661, 667, 851, 870, 873, 905, 912
 Medford: 219, 306, 350, 391, 393, 395, 396, 475, 498, 518, 526, 539, 628, 655, 658, 723, 827, 866, 874, 957, 960
 Melrose: 432, 462, 517, 590, 606, 620, 662, 665, 712, 720, 979
 Needham: 247, 292, 343, 400, 429, 433, 444, 449, 453, 455, 465, 474, 495, 514, 540, 559, 644, 657, 707, 719, 726, 727, 898, 965, 972
 Norwood (includes part of Westwood): 255, 369, 278, 349, 352, 414, 440, 501, 551, 603, 619, 634, 680, 688, 702, 725, 762, 769, 856, 881, 929, 948, 949, 956
 Randolph (includes Holbrook): 300, 308, 390, 437, 473, 506, 510, 607, 767, 785, 815, 824, 885, 888, 961, 963, 986
 Reading: 205, 282, 315, 439, 509, 649, 670, 673, 677, 758, 764, 765, 779, 872, 909, 942, 944
 Revere: 241, 284, 286, 289, 426, 485, 549, 560, 629, 656, 808, 823, 853, 858, 922, 951, 953, 
 Saugus: 231, 233, 
558
 Stoneham: 279, 435, 438, 454, 481, 507, 568, 572, 799, 832, 835, 850, 954, 984
 Wakefield: 213, 224, 245, 246, 258, 295, 360, 451, 486, 548, 557, 567, 587, 621, 683, 716, 876, 914, 928, 968
 Waltham (includes part of Weston): 207, 208, 209, 212, 216, 249, 250, 256, 290, 296, 299, 314, 317, 330, 370, 373, 386, 392, 398, 409, 419, 434, 464, 466, 472, 478, 487, 513, 516, 522, 529, 530, 543, 547, 577, 609, 612, 614, 622, 642, 647, 663, 668, 672, 678, 684, 693, 697, 699, 736, 768, 775, 786, 788, 790, 795, 810, 833, 839, 864, 890, 891, 893, 894, 895, 899, 902, 906, 907, 916, 966, 996
 Wellesley (includes part of Weston): 235, 237, 239, 263, 283, 304, 371, 416, 431, 446, 489, 591, 694, 705, 772, 943, 992, 997
 Weymouth: 277, 331, 335, 337, 340, 413, 534, 624, 626, 637, 682, 724, 789, 803, 812, 901, 927, 974, 985
 Winchester: 218, 358, 368, 369, 389, 570, 589, 604, 625, 717, 721, 722, 729, 756, 760, 838, 971, 977, 983
 Woburn: 281, 287, 305, 367, 376, 404, 405, 460, 491, 496, 497, 503, 504, 528, 537, 569, 608, 638, 640, 696, 704, 759, 782, 787, 865, 883, 897, 904, 932, 933, 935, 937, 938, 939, 962, 670, 994, 995

(339)-NXX

 Arlington: 368, 707
 Braintree: 235
 Bryantville: 244, 933
 Burlington: 234
 Cambridge: 550, 940, 976
 Canton: 237, 502
 Cohasset: 337
 Dedham: 204
 Hingham: 200, 236
 Kingston: 309, 832
 Lexington: 223, 970
 Lincoln: 333
 Lowell: 920
 Lynn: 440, 883
 Malden: 224
 Marshfield: 793
 Medford:221, 545, 674
 Melrose: 293
 Needham: 225
 Norwell: 613
 Norwood: 206
 Randolph: 987
 Revere: 226, 532
 Rockland: 469, 788
 Saugus: 600
 Scituate: 526
 Sharon: 230, 364
 Wakefield: 203, 219
 Waltham: 222, 814
 Wellesley: 686
 Weymouth: 355, 499
 Woburn: 227, 298, 645, 927

N11 codes

2-1-1: United Way Worldwide (UWW) and the Alliance for Information and Referral Systems (AIRS)
3-1-1: unused
4-1-1: directory assistance
5-1-1: traffic information or police non-emergency services (treated as calling to the 617 area code)
6-1-1: unused
7-1-1: TDD relay (MassRelay) for the deaf
8-1-1: underground public utility location (Dig Safe),
9-1-1: emergency services

See also
List of area codes in Massachusetts
List of NANP area codes
North American Numbering Plan

References

External links

 Massachusetts Area Code Map, Mass. Department of Telecommunications and Cable

781
781
Telecommunications-related introductions in 1997
Telecommunications-related introductions in 2001
1997 establishments in Massachusetts
2001 establishments in Massachusetts